The 2000 United States presidential election in Alabama took place on November 7, 2000, and was part of the 2000 United States presidential election. Voters chose 9 representatives, or electors to the Electoral College, who voted for president and vice president.

Alabama was won by Republican Governor George W. Bush with a 14.88% margin of victory. He won the majority of counties and congressional districts in the state. Vice President Al Gore, the Democratic Party candidate, remains the last candidate of his party to win Choctaw, Colbert, Lawrence, and Jackson counties in a presidential election.

, this is the last time a Democrat won over 40 percent of the vote as a presidential candidate, as well as the last time the Republican nominee won less than 60 percent of the vote. It is also the last time that Alabama voted to the left of neighboring Mississippi.

Results

By county

Counties that flipped from Democratic to Republican
Butler (Largest city: Greenville)
Chambers (Largest city: Valley)
Cherokee (Largest city: Centre)
Clarke (Largest city: Jackson)
Coosa (Largest city: Goodwater)
Crenshaw (Largest city: Luverne)
Etowah (Largest city: Gadsden)
Fayette (Largest city: Fayette)
Franklin (Largest city: Russellville)
Marion (Largest city: Hamilton)
Pickens (Largest city: Aliceville)
Walker (Largest city: Jasper)
Washington (Largest city: Chatom)

By congressional district
Bush won 6 of 7 congressional districts, including one held by a Democrat.

Electors 

Technically the voters of Alabama cast their ballots for electors: representatives to the Electoral College. Alabama is allocated 9 electors because it has 7 congressional districts and 2 senators. All candidates who appear on the ballot or qualify to receive write-in votes must submit a list of 9 electors, who pledge to vote for their candidate and his or her running mate. Whoever wins the majority of votes in the state is awarded all 9 electoral votes. Their chosen electors then vote for president and vice president. Although electors are pledged to their candidate and running mate, they are not obligated to vote for them. An elector who votes for someone other than his or her candidate is known as a faithless elector.

The electors of each state and the District of Columbia met on December 18, 2000, to cast their votes for president and vice president. The Electoral College itself never meets as one body. Instead the electors from each state and the District of Columbia met in their respective capitols.

The following were the members of the Electoral College from the state. All were pledged to and voted for George W. Bush and Dick Cheney:
Glen Dunlap
Bob Fincher
Homer Jackson
Jerry Lathan
Elaine Little
Melba Peters
Martha Stokes
Jean Sullivan
Edgar Welden

See also
United States presidential elections in Alabama

References

Alabama
2000 Alabama elections
2000